William C. Apgar is an American economist who served as United States Assistant Secretary of Housing and Urban Development for Housing during the presidency of Bill Clinton. Apgar graduated from Williams College and received a Ph.D. in economics from Harvard University.

References

Williams College alumni
Harvard Graduate School of Arts and Sciences alumni
United States Assistant Secretaries of Housing and Urban Development
Living people
Year of birth missing (living people)
American economists
Place of birth missing (living people)